Filipów , is a village in Suwałki County, Podlaskie Voivodeship, in north-eastern Poland. It is the seat of the gmina (administrative district) called Gmina Filipów. In 2006 the village has a population of 1,814.

Formerly a town, Filipów had a city rights from 1570 to 1870, when, as many other former towns in Poland, it lost this status after the January Uprising.

It was a site of Battle of Filipów in 1656.

References

External links
Official site of Filipów 
Unofficial site of Filipów

Villages in Suwałki County
Białystok Voivodeship (1919–1939)